Kuvshinnoye is a rural locality in Besedinsky Selsoviet Rural Settlement, Kursky District, Kursk Oblast, Russia. Population:

Geography 
The village is located on the Seym River (a left tributary of the Desna), 100 km from the Russia–Ukraine border, 16 km south-east of the district center – the town Kursk, 6 km from the selsoviet center – Besedino.

 Climate
Kuvshinnoye has a warm-summer humid continental climate (Dfb in the Köppen climate classification).

Transport 
Kuvshinnoye is located 6 km from the federal route  (Kursk – Voronezh –  "Kaspy" Highway; a part of the European route ), 3 km from the road of regional importance  (R-298 – Polevaya), on the road of intermunicipal significance  (R-298 – Belomestnoye – Kuvshinnoye), 3.5 km from the nearest railway halt Kolodnoye (railway line Klyukva — Belgorod).

The rural locality is situated 17.5 km from Kursk Vostochny Airport, 111 km from Belgorod International Airport and 192 km from Voronezh Peter the Great Airport.

References

Notes

Sources

Rural localities in Kursky District, Kursk Oblast